The Texas Conference for Women is a nonprofit, nonpartisan leadership conference for women of all ages and backgrounds. The first annual conference was held in 2000 in Austin, Texas as a one-day event consisting of keynote addresses and breakout sessions led by experts in the fields of business, philanthropy, health, finance, media and professional development. Programming is directed toward working women and touches on both professional and personal development. Attendees learn new communication skills, leadership strategies and work/life balance tools designed to enhance their professional and personal growth.

In response to the COVID-19 pandemic in 2020 and 2021, the Conference was moved to a virtual format. In 2022, the Conference is offering both an in-person event in Austin and an online event.

Current keynote speakers include: 
 Chimamanda Ngozi Adichie, award-winning author
 José Andrés, chef, humanitarian & founder, World Central Kitchen
 Brené Brown, researcher & storyteller
 Selena Gomez, actor, producer, singer, philanthropist

Past speakers 
 
 Yolanda Adams
 Isabel Allende
 Maya Angelou
 Jennifer Arnold
 Martha Beck
 Jennifer Berman
 Laura Berman
 Bertice Berry
 Cherie Blair
 Lindy Boggs
 Barbara Bradley Baekgaard
 Nancy Brinker
 Douglas Brinkley
 Neissa Brown Springmann
 Marcus Buckingham
 Jeri Callaway
 Katherine Center
 Johnnetta Cole
 Jody Conradt
 Kathleen Daelemans
  Sarah Ferguson
 Carly Fiorina
 Vonetta Flowers
 Nely Galán
 Melinda Gates
 Nancy Giles
 Glenda Hatchett
 Christy Haubegger
 Jessica Herrin
 Maria Hinojosa
 Karen Hughes
 Mae Jemison
 Tory Johnson
 Marion Jones
 Sarah Jones
 Doris Kearns Goodwin
 Geraldine Laybourne
 Nastia Liukin
 Marcus Luttrell
 Robert Malone
 Rose Mapendo
 Sara Martinez Tucker
 Cindy McCain
 Pat Mitchell
 Jeff Moseley
 Lisa Niemi Swayze
 Suze Orman
 Turk Pipkin
 Rend Rahim Francke
 Condoleezza Rice
 Ann Richards
 Cokie Roberts
 Rebecca Roberts
 Leslie Sanchez
 Ruth Simmons
 Melinda Spaulding
 Martha Stewart
 Helen Thomas
 Leigh Anne Tuohy
 Elizabeth Vargas
 Lori Vetters
 Andrea White
 Meg Whitman
 Mary Wilson

External links 
 

Non-profit organizations based in Texas
Women in Texas